The following is a list of people related to University of Maryland Global Campus (formerly University of Maryland University College). The university president is Javier Miyares since 2012.

This is not a complete list. Please add more information with cited sources. (May 2014)

Alumni

 Doreen Baingana
 Elizabeth Bobo
 Frank D. Celebrezze Jr.
 Sarah Cohen (journalist)
 Said Durrah
 Dale Dye
 Hakan Fidan
 William D. Houser
 Thomas E. Hutchins
 Ray Lewis
 Edward J. Perkins
 James N. Robey
 Jalen Rose
 John William Vessey, Jr.
 John Bruce Wallace

Faculty

 Susan C. Aldridge
 G. "Anand" Anandalingam
 Jiří Březina
 Jeffrey Gramlich
 J. Greg Hanson
 John Benjamin Henck
 James Howard
 Karen Kwiatkowski
 Donna Leon
 Tobe Levin
 Patrick Mendis
 Arnold Resnicoff
 Leonard Swidler

References